Ely Rangers Association Football Club are a Welsh association football team founded in 1965. They are based in Ely, Cardiff and they play at Station Road, Wenvoe near Cardiff.

History

Ely Rangers' origins date back to 1963–64 at a time when the club did not have enough players to put out a full side, so they joined with Heath Park Rangers. After just one season, a chance meeting with other boys from Ely whilst on holiday at Butlins resulted in the formation of Ely Rangers AFC in 1965. The club joined the Cardiff Combination League and quickly established themselves as a major playing force, in season 1967–68 they were crowned champions of the first division, and within two seasons in the senior division they won the first of five championships, their further triumphs came in 1970–71, 1975–76, 1977–78 and 1978–79. The club's success was not limited to the league, as they won the Combination Cup on five occasions, the City Supporters Cup four times and the Senior Cup twice. Following this successful period, the club were on the look out for a Ground of their own, so they could further their ambition of South Wales Amateur League status. In 1983 Ely Rangers moved into Station Road Wenvoe, and were accepted into the Amateur League. Success followed, winning the Corinthian Cup and the SWFA Amateur cup twice.

In the Amateur League the best finish was runners up, until the 1996–97 season where Ely Rangers won the First Division Championship under Manager John Boulton. Rangers then had to contest a play-off with old local rivals Caerau Ely, at Ninian Park and won the game 3–0 in front of 1,300 spectators, to claim their place in the Welsh Football League for season 1997–98.

In the Welsh League, Rangers spent the first three seasons in division three finishing 5th, 5th, and then runners up (drawing only 3 games and winning the rest) and in turn promotion. Division Two was a short stay of only one season finishing 3rd and again gaining promotion. Season 2001–02, Ely entered into the First Division and finished in eighth position, however, in the last few seasons Ely have finished 15th, and 14th twice.

At the end of the 2018-19 season the club were relegated from the Welsh Football League and joined the South Wales Alliance League Premier Division. They were then relegated for a second successive season at the end of the 2019–20 season, dropping to the First Division for 2020–21.

Club Crest

The Ely Rangers AFC crest dates back to the club's formation in the 1960s.

The club received a great deal of help in its early days from Barclays Bank (a link that is still alive today) and the 'iron eagle' that forms the basis of the club's crest is directly linked to the old Barclays logo.

The club crest is completed by the addition of the club name above the eagle, along with the club's year of formation beneath it.

The club's nickname of 'The Griffins' also derives from the crest after the club's eagle symbol was mistaken for that of the griffin mythical creature.

Current Senior Team squad

Club Committee
 Director of Football :  Jason Clarke
 1st Team Manager:  Stevie McCarthy-Campbell
 1st Team Coach:  Tony Barnett
 Secretaries :  Lee Smith & Jason Jones
 Kitman:  Paul Bryant
 Groundsman:  Paul Bryant

References

External links
 Official website

Football clubs in Wales
Association football clubs established in 1965
1965 establishments in Wales
Football clubs in Cardiff
Welsh Football League clubs
South Wales Alliance League clubs
South Wales Amateur League clubs
Cardiff Combination League clubs